Dolichodinera is a genus of bristle flies in the family Tachinidae. There is at least one described species in Dolichodinera, D. divaricata.

Distribution
Guyana.

References

Dexiinae
Diptera of South America
Monotypic Brachycera genera
Tachinidae genera
Taxa named by Charles Henry Tyler Townsend